Sophie (or Sofie) Sager, (Växjö, Sweden, 1825 – New York City, United States, 1902), was a Swedish writer and feminist. She was one of the first feminist activists and speakers for the modern women's movement in Sweden. She is also known for her part in the famous Sager Case (1848), where she sued a man for attempted rape and won the case, which was one of the most famous Swedish criminal cases of her time.

Life
She was born to a wealthy family and was educated in a girls' school. As an adult, she became poor and supported herself as governess. She wished to start a dress-shop, and educated herself to a tailor in Stockholm in 1848. In Stockholm, she was offered a room by an elder man by the name of Möller. She accepted, but was attacked sexually by him in her bed at his house. Sager fought back, and frustrated by her resistance, Möller abused her badly, although she managed to resist an actual rape. She managed to escape his house and was given help by a doctor, who documented her injuries and encouraged her to report Möller to the police.

During this age, it was very unusual for a woman to report a rape of her own free will, as it was considered very shameful, and the case was given enormous attention in the press. Möller claimed Sager was insane, but the court was convinced by the doctors medical report, and judged Möller as guilty of attempted rape and violence. After this, Sager became one of the first feminist activists of the new women's movement in Sweden, touring the country to speak of women's rights. She claimed that women became passive with regard to their few rights and were given a low confidence in themselves because of their poor education, and took her own education as an example; she had been given her education in a girls' school, which did not teach much more than French and etiquette. At one occasion, she spoke dressed in male clothing.

In 1852, she published the autobiography: Bilder ur livet. Ett fosterbarns avslöjande genealogi (Images of life. The revealing tale of a foster child) of her experiences.

Sager moved to the US in 1854, where she became active within the American women's movement. She married the music teacher E. A. Wiener.

Quotes 
"I am the one who defies the false ideals of opinion, to enable myself to show my emancipation in my way of life.”

”I am the first woman in Sweden, to stand for the emancipation-theory in public, and therefore, it can not yet be so common, as it will be some day.”

References 
Isa Edholm: Kvinnohistoria (Women history)(2001) Falun, Alfabeta Bokförlag AB, Stockholm 
Gunhild Kyle and Eva von Krusenstjerna: Kvinnoprofiler (Female profiles) (1993) Norstedts Tryckeri AB Stockholm

Further reading 
 

Swedish feminists
1825 births
1902 deaths
Swedish governesses
19th-century Swedish people
Swedish women's rights activists